This is a list of Russian football transfers in the 2015 summer transfer window by club. Only clubs of the 2015–16 Russian Premier League are included. The transfers that were completed after the 2014–15 winter transfer window, closed on 27 February 2015, are included here.

Russian Premier League 2015–16

Amkar Perm

In:

Out:

Anzhi Makhachkala

In:

Out:

CSKA Moscow

In:

Out:

Dynamo Moscow

In:

Out:

Krasnodar

In:

Out:

Krylia Sovetov Samara

In:

Out:

Kuban Krasnodar

In:

Out:

Lokomotiv Moscow

In:

Out:

Mordovia Saransk

In:

Out:

Rostov

In:

Out:

Rubin Kazan

In:

Out:

Spartak Moscow

In:

Out:

Terek Grozny

In:

Out:

Ufa

In:

Out:

Ural Sverdlovsk Oblast

In:

Out:

Zenit Saint Petersburg

In:

Out:

References

Transfers
2015
Russia